Kathy Mattea is the debut studio album by the American country music singer of the same name. It was released in 1984 (see 1984 in country music) on Mercury Records. It includes the singles "Street Talk", "Someone Is Falling in Love", "You've Got a Soft Place to Fall", and "That's Easy for You to Say". The song "(Back to the) Heartbreak Kid" was later released in 1986 by Restless Heart from their self-titled debut album.

Track listing

Personnel
Kathy Mattea – lead vocals, background vocals, acoustic guitar
Mark Casstevens – acoustic guitar
Gregg Galbraith – electric guitar
Jon Goin – electric guitar
Chris Leuzinger – electric guitar
Dale Sellers – electric guitar
Sonny Garrish – pedal steel guitar
David Briggs – piano
Bobby Wood – piano
Spady Brannan – bass guitar
Alan Rush – bass guitar
Gene Chrisman – drums
Tommy Wells – drums
Curtis Young – background vocals
Wade McCurdy – background vocals
Pat McManus – background vocals
Marcy Cates – background vocals
Margie Cates – background vocals
Nashville String Machine – strings; arranged by D. Bergen White

Production notes
Produced by Rick Peoples, Byron Hill
Engineered by Mike Poston, Joe Scaife, George W. Clinton, Jim Cotton
Mastered by Tom Coyne

Chart performance

Release history

References

External links
[ Kathy Mattea] at AllMusic

1984 debut albums
Kathy Mattea albums
Mercury Nashville albums
Albums produced by Byron Hill